Stay Down may refer to:

Trade unionism
"Stay down strike", a 1935 coal miners' strike in Cwmfelinfach
Stay Down, Miner (1937), a play by Montagu Slater

Albums
Stay Down (album), by the Smoking Popes (2008)

Songs
"Stay Down" (Lil Durk, 6lack and Young Thug song), (2020)
"Stay Down" (Mary J. Blige song), (2007)
"Stay Down" by Royal Hunt, on the album Moving Target (1995)
"Stay Down" by Krayzie Bone featuring Akon, on the album The Fixtape Vol. 1: Smoke on This (2008)
"Stay Down" by Moby, on the album Wait for Me (2009)
"Stay Down" by El-P, album on the album Cancer 4 Cure (2012)
"Stay Down Here Where You Belong" by Irving Berlin (1914)